Psathyrella moseri is a species of agaric fungus in the family Psathyrellaceae. Found in Argentina, it was described as new to science by mycologist Rolf Singer in 1969.

See also
List of Psathyrella species

References

External links

Fungi described in 1969
Fungi of Argentina
Psathyrellaceae
Taxa named by Rolf Singer